Ottman Azaitar (born February 20, 1990) is a German mixed martial artist who currently competes in the Lightweight division of the Ultimate Fighting Championship. He is the younger brother of UFC fighter Abu Azaitar.

Background
Ottman Azaitar was born to a Moroccan family in Cologne, Germany. Azaitar grew up in the Dellbrück district of Cologne until he moved with his family to Weiden.  He attended the King Fahd Academy in Bonn until the age of 15 where he was raised with traditional Islamic upbringings. The controversial school, which shut down in 2017 of its own accord, was funded by the Saudi government and suspected of “attracting Islamists to Germany.”  At the academy, all school subjects were taught exclusively in Arabic. This unusual school career initially had a negative impact on his German language skills, which became noticeable when he moved to the Hildegard of Bingen Gymnasium in Cologne. However, the initial language difficulties were overcome and he left the high school after graduating in 2012 with a grade point average of 1.9. After graduating from high school, he took up studies in business administration.

He began his sports career as a six-year-old boy. Until the age of ten, he learned the techniques of jiu-jitsu. He then switched to boxing, muay thai and kickboxing, in which he also won several important titles until 2012. These include his title as champion in muay Thai of the state of North Rhine-Westphalia in 2011 and the following year as German champion in muay Thai. At the same time, Azaitar joined the German national muay Thai team and participated in the world championship in Saint Petersburg on May 19-28, 2012.

Mixed martial arts career

Early career
Starting his career in 2014, Ottman fought mainly in regional German promotions and then later joined Brave Combat Federation. While in BRAVE, in his third fight for the organization, at BRAVE CF 9 on November 17, 2017 in Bahrain, he won the BRAVE Combat Federation Lightweight Championship against Alejandro Martinez via 3rd round TKO. In his next fight, he fought Danijel Kokora in a welterweight non-title bout, picking up a 31-second KO. He was later stripped of the Lightweight Championship after refusing to defend it in a timely manner, with Mohammed Shahid, the President of Brave CF, releasing the following statement:

“Ottoman Azaitar has had a great career with Brave Combat Federation, fighting a really good fight in Morocco which was not for the title. If you look at the lightweight division today, we have not had a title defense for nearly a year at this point. Of course, this is very unfair to the division as a whole, and we have to make a decision on that. We are confirming right now; November in Bahrain, we will have a lightweight title fight. And we’ve been working to make that fight happen for a while now. If we don't have that caliber of fighters, the one is willing to fight against the best in the world, that fighter doesn't have a place here at Brave, To make it official; we have stripped Ottman Azaitar of the lightweight title. We will have a match for the vacant title during the Brave International fight Week in November. The most important thing here, the message, is to make sure that we have athletes who actively want to fight the best in the world – especially as champion.”

Ultimate Fighting Championship
On September 7, 2019, Ottman made his UFC debut at UFC 242 against Teemu Packalén. He won the fight via knockout in the first round.

A bout between Azaitar and Khama Worthy was previously scheduled to take place at UFC 249. However, the event was cancelled in early April due to the COVID-19 pandemic. The fight was then rescheduled to UFC Fight Night: Overeem vs. Sakai. In turn, the pair was removed from that event due to undisclosed reasons and moved to UFC Fight Night: Waterson vs. Hill Azaitar went on to win the fight via technical knockout in the first round. This fight earned him the Performance of the Night award.

On November 21, 2020, it was announced that Azaitar was scheduled to fight against Matt Frevola on January 24, 2021 at UFC 257. However, on the day of the weigh-ins it was announced that Azaitar withdrew from the bout. It was later announced that Ottman had broken safety protocols and Dana White released the following statement on the matter:
“He and his team cut their wristbands off and got them to people on the outside, one guy, This guy got inside the bubble, went in through a room, shimmied down four balconies, went in through (Azaitar's) balcony, and dropped off a bag of we don't know what. Then he changed his clothes and went back outside of the bubble. We got everything on camera, we saw the whole thing, and how it all went down, pulled his fight and cut him.”

As the result of the breach in COVID-19 safety protocols, Azaitar was released from UFC on January 23, 2021. However, one month later, UFC decided to reverse the decision after taking a strong stand of their initial decision, UFC reinstated Azaitar stating to give Azaitar the "second chance".

After almost 2 years away from the octagon, the bout between Azaitar and  Matt Frevola was rescheduled for November 12, 2022 at UFC 281. He lost the fight via knockout in the first round.

Championships and accomplishments
Ultimate Fighting Championship
Performance of the Night (Two time) 
Brave Combat Federation
BRAVE Combat Federation Lightweight Championship (One time)

Mixed martial arts record

|-
|Loss
|align=center|13–1
|Matt Frevola
|KO (punch)
|UFC 281
|
|align=center|1
|align=center|2:30
|New York City, New York, United States
|
|-
|Win
|align=center|13–0
|Khama Worthy
|TKO (punches)
|UFC Fight Night: Waterson vs. Hill
|
|align=center|1
|align=center|1:33
|Las Vegas, Nevada, United States
|
|-
|Win
|align=center|12–0
|Teemu Packalén
|KO (punch)
|UFC 242 
|
|align=center|1
|align=center|3:35
|Abu Dhabi, United Arab Emirates
|
|-
|Win
|align=center|11–0
|Danijel Kokora
|KO (punch)
|Brave CF 14
|
|align=center|1
|align=center|0:32
|Tangier, Morocco
|
|- 
| Win
| align=center|10–0
|Alejandro Martinez
|TKO (punches)
|Brave CF 9: The Kingdom of Champions
|
|align=center|3
|align=center|1:16
|Isa Town, Bahrain
|
|-
|Win
|align=center|9–0
|Charlie Leary
|TKO (punches)
|Brave FC 4: Unstoppable
|
|align=center|1
|align=center|2:22
|Abu Dhabi, United Arab Emirates
|
|-
|Win
|align=center|8–0
|Kevin Koldobsky
|Decision (unanimous)
|Brave FC 2: Dynasty
|
|align=center|3
|align=center|5:00
|Isa Town, Bahrain
|
|-
|Win
|align=center|7–0
|Łukasz Szczerek
|TKO (punches)
|GMC 8
|
|align=center|1
|align=center|0:56
|Castrop-Rauxel, Germany
|
|-
|Win
|align=center|6–0
|Ramūnas Paliunis
|TKO (punches)
|Fair FC 4
|
|align=center|1
|align=center|1:16
|Eindhoven, Netherlands
|
|-
|Win
|align=center|5–0
|Christoph Hector
|Submission (guillotine choke)
|Mix Fight Gala 18
|
|align=center|1
|align=center|2:57
|Fulda, Germany
|
|-
|Win
|align=center|4–0
|Serge Dali
|Submission (rear naked choke)
|GMC 6
|
|align=center|1
|align=center|3:30
|Castrop-Rauxel, Germany
|
|-
|Win
|align=center|3–0
|Ilbey Akdas
|KO (punch)
|Fair FC 3
|
|align=center|1
|align=center|0:14
|Rheinberg, Germany
|
|-
|Win
|align=center|2–0
|Alexander Vogt
|TKO (submission to punches)
|Fair FC 2
|
|align=center|2
|align=center|4:01
|Herne, Germany
|
|-
|Win
|align=center|1–0
|Patrick Talmon
|TKO (punches)
|Showdown Fight Night
|
|align=center|1
|align=center|0:19
|Mannheim, Germany
|

See also
 List of current UFC fighters
 List of male mixed martial artists

References

External links
 
 

1990 births
Living people
German male mixed martial artists
Lightweight mixed martial artists
Mixed martial artists utilizing Muay Thai
Mixed martial artists utilizing boxing
German people of Moroccan descent
German Muay Thai practitioners
German male boxers
German male kickboxers
Sportspeople from Cologne
Ultimate Fighting Championship male fighters